The molars or molar teeth are large, flat teeth at the back of the mouth. They are more developed in mammals. They are used primarily to grind food during chewing. The name molar derives from Latin, molaris dens, meaning "millstone tooth", from mola, millstone and dens, tooth. Molars show a great deal of diversity in size and shape across mammal groups. The third molar of humans is sometimes vestigial.

Human anatomy

In humans, the molar teeth have either four or five cusps. Adult humans have 12 molars, in four groups of three at the back of the mouth. The third, rearmost molar in each group is called a wisdom tooth. It is the last tooth to appear, breaking through the front of the gum at about the age of 20, although this varies among individuals and populations, and in many cases the tooth is missing.

The human mouth contains upper (maxillary) and lower (mandibular) molars. They are: maxillary first molar, maxillary second molar, maxillary third molar, mandibular first molar, mandibular second molar, and mandibular third molar.

Mammal evolution

In mammals, the crown of the molars and premolars is folded into a wide range of complex shapes. The basic elements of the crown are the more or less conical projections called cusps and the valleys that separate them. The cusps contain both dentine and enamel, whereas minor projections on the crown, called crenulations, are the result of different enamel thickness. Cusps are occasionally joined to form ridges and expanded to form crests. Cingula are often incomplete ridges that pass around the base of the crown.

Mammalian, multicusped cheek teeth probably evolved from single-cusped teeth in synapsids, although the diversity of therapsid molar patterns and the complexity in the molars of the earliest mammals make determining how this happened impossible. According to the widely accepted "differentiation theory", additional cusps have arisen by budding or outgrowth from the crown, while the rivalling "concrescence theory" instead proposes that complex teeth evolved by the clustering of originally separate conical teeth.  Therian mammals (placentals and marsupials) are generally agreed to have evolved from an ancestor with tribosphenic cheek teeth, with three main cusps arranged in a triangle.

Morphology
Each major cusp on an upper molar is called a cone and is identified by a prefix dependent on its relative location on the tooth: proto-, para-, meta-, hypo-, and ento-. Suffixes are added to these names: -id is added to cusps on a lower molar (e.g., protoconid); -ule to a minor cusp (e.g., protoconulid). A shelf-like ridge on the lower part of the crown (on an upper molar) is called a cingulum; the same feature on the lower molar a cingulid, and a minor cusp on these, for example, a cingular cuspule or conulid.

Tribosphenic

The design that is considered one of the most important characteristics of therian mammals is called a tribosphenic molar. Among living mammals, the tribosphenic tooth is found in most insectivorous mammals as well as young platypuses, even though adults platypuses are toothless.

In tribosphenic teeth, the lower molar is divided into two regions: the three-cusped trigonid, or shearing end, and the talonid, or crushing heel. In modern tribosphenic molars, the trigonid is towards the front of the jaw and the talonid is towards the rear. The trigonid is defined by three large cusps: the protoconid is on the buccal/labial (cheek) side of the tooth, while the anterior paraconid and posterior metaconid are on the lingual (tongue) side.

Upper molars look like three-pointed mountain ranges, with their features mirrored from the lower molars. The protocone cusp is on the lingual side of the tooth, while the anterior paracone and posterior metacone are on the buccal side. The protocone of the upper molar and talonid basin of the lower molar mesh together as a crushing system similar to a mortar and pestle.

Tribosphenic molars were present in the direct ancestors of all three living mammal groups, but it was most likely not ancestral to mammals as a whole. Many paleontologists argue that it developed independently in monotremes (from australosphenidans), rather than being inherited from a common ancestor that they share with marsupials and placentals (from boreosphenidans); this idea still has some critics. For example, the dentition of the Early Cretaceous monotreme Steropodon is similar to those of Peramus and dryolestoids, which suggests that monotremes are related to some pre-tribosphenic mammals, but, on the other hand, the status of neither of these two groups is well-established.

Some Jurassic mammaliaforms, such as docodonts and shuotheriids, have "reversed tribosphenic" molars, in which a talonid-like structure develops towards the front of the lower molar, rather than towards the rear. This variant is regarded as an example of convergent evolution.

Quadrate

From the primitive tribosphenic tooth, molars have diversified into several unique morphologies. In many groups, a fourth cusp, the hypocone (hypoconid), subsequently evolved (see below). Quadrate (also called quadritubercular or euthemorphic) molars have a hypocone, an additional fourth cusp on the lingual (tongue) side of the upper molar, located posterior to the protocone. Quadrate molars appeared early in mammal evolution and are present in many species, including hedgehogs, raccoons, and many primates, including humans. There may be a fifth cusp.

In many mammals, additional smaller cusps called conules appear between the larger cusps. They are named after their locations, e.g. a paraconule is located between a paracone and a metacone, a hypoconulid is located between a hypoconid and an entoconid.

Bunodont

In bunodont molars, the cusps are low and rounded hills rather than sharp peaks. They are most common among omnivores such as pigs, bears, and humans. Bunodont molars are effective crushing devices and often basically quadrate in shape.

Hypsodont
Hypsodont dentition is characterized by high-crowned teeth and enamel that extends far past the gum line, which provides extra material for wear and tear. Some examples of animals with hypsodont dentition are cattle and horses, all animals that feed on gritty, fibrous material. Hypsodont molars can continue to grow throughout life, for example in some species of Arvicolinae (herbivorous rodents).

Hypsodont molars lack both a crown and a neck. The occlusal surface is rough and mostly flat, adapted for crushing and grinding plant material. The body is covered with cementum both above and below the gingival line, below which is a layer of enamel covering the entire length of the body. The cementum and the enamel invaginate into the thick layer of dentin.

Brachydont
The opposite condition to hypsodont is called brachydont or brachyodont (from brachys 'short'). It is a type of dentition characterized by low-crowned teeth. Human teeth are brachydont.

A brachydont tooth has a crown above the gingival line and a neck just below it, and at least one root. A cap of enamel covers the crown and extends down to the neck. Cementum is only found below the gingival line. The occlusal surfaces tend to be pointed, well-suited for holding prey and tearing and shredding.

Zalambdodont
Zalambdodont molars have three cusps, one larger on the lingual side and two smaller on the labial side, joined by two crests that form a V- or λ-shape. The larger inner cusp might be homologous with the paracone in a tribosphenic molar, but can also be fused with the metacone. The protocone is typically missing. The two smaller labial cusps are located on an expanded shelf called the stylar shelf. Zalambdodont molars are found in, for example, golden moles and solenodons.

Dilambdodont
Like zalambdodont molars, dilambdodont molars have a distinct ectoloph, but are shaped like two lambdas or a W. On the lingual side, at the bottom of the W, are the metacone and paracone, and the stylar shelf is on the labial side. A protocone is present lingual to the ectoloph. Dilambdodont molars are present in shrews, moles, and some insectivorous bats.

Lophodont

Lophodont teeth are easily identified by the differentiating patterns of ridges or lophs of enamel interconnecting the cusps on the crowns. Present in most herbivores, these patterns of lophs can be a simple, ring-like edge, as in mole rats, or a complex arrangement of series of ridges and cross-ridges, as those in odd-toed ungulates, such as equids.

Lophodont molars have hard and elongated enamel ridges called lophs oriented either along or perpendicular to the dental row. Lophodont molars are common in herbivores that grind their food thoroughly. Examples include tapirs, manatees, and many rodents.

When two lophs form transverse, often ring-shaped, ridges on a tooth, the arrangement is called bilophodont. This pattern is common in primates, but can also be found in lagomorphs (hares, rabbits, and pikas) and some rodents.

Extreme forms of lophodonty in elephants and some rodents (such as Otomys) is known as loxodonty. The African elephant belongs to a genus called Loxodonta because of this feature.

Selenodont
In selenodont molars (so-named after moon goddess Selene), the major cusp is elongated into crescent-shaped ridge. Examples include most even-toed ungulates, such as cattle and deer.

Secodont

Many carnivorous mammals have enlarged and blade-like teeth especially adapted for slicing and chopping called carnassials. A general term for such blade-like teeth is secodont or plagiaulacoid.

See also

Dental formula
Polyphyodont

Notes

References

External links
 Overview of molar morphology and terminology- Paleos.com

Types of teeth

be:Маларэ
eo:Vangodento#Molaro